Ramishan (also Romanized as Rāmīshān) is a village in Hajjilu Rural District, in the Central District of Kabudarahang County, Hamadan Province, Iran. At the 2006 census, its population was 807, in 228 families.

References 

Populated places in Kabudarahang County